Piljeh (also Romanized as Pīljeh; also known as Jūrpīlī Jān and Pīljān) is a village in Amlash-e Jonubi Rural District, in the Central District of Amlash County, Gilan Province, Iran. At the 2006 census, its population was 310, in 72 families.

References 

Populated places in Amlash County